The 2013–14 A Group was the 90th season of the top division of the Bulgarian football league system, and 66th since a league format was adopted for the national competition of A Group as a top tier of the pyramid. The season started on 19 July 2013 with the opening game between Chernomorets and Cherno More; the season ended on 18 May 2014 with the last game between Ludogorets Razgrad and Cherno More.

For the first time after twelve years the competition was divided into two phases - Regular season, with every team playing against every other team  twice, and Playoffs, with teams divided into Championship group (top seven) and Relegation group (bottom seven) to determine the champions and the relegated teams, respectively.

Ludogorets Razgrad went into the season as two-time defending champions and managed to retain the title for a third consecutive and overall time, after winning their match with Lokomotiv Plovdiv on 7 May two rounds before the end of the season.

Competition format

Season 2013-14 has some changes in the tournament format compared to the previous season. For the first time since 2001–02 the championship is divided in two phases. 
In the first phase, the Regular season, every team must play two times against each of the other teams on home-away basis for a subtotal of 26 matches.

In the second phase, the Play-offs, the teams are divided into Championship group (first seven) and Relegation group (bottom seven). In those two parallel played groups every team has to play two times, again on home-away basis, only against the remaining six teams in the group for a subtotal of 12 matches. Since there is an odd number of teams in each group (seven), each round of the Play-offs in a group consists only of three games between six teams, and the odd team does not play in the round. Hence, there are fourteen rounds in the second phase of the season, despite there being only twelve matches for each team of the two groups to play.
Thus, the season has a total of 40 rounds.

At the end of the season, the champion earns a place in the UEFA Champions League qualifying rounds, while the next two or three clubs in the final standings of Bulgaria's A PFG league table (depending on the winner of the 2013–14 Bulgarian Cup) earn the right to play in UEFA's Europa League qualifying rounds. The last four teams in the table (from 11th to 14th place) are directly relegated to B Group for the next season while only two clubs from the lower division are promoted, effectively reducing the number of teams in A Group for the next season by two - making the Bulgarian top football division to consist of 12 teams as of season 2014–15.

Teams
A total of fourteen teams are contesting the league, including the best 12 sides from the previous 2012–13 season, plus two promoted clubs from the 2012–13 B Group.

As finishing in the bottom four places of the table at the end of season 2012–13, Botev Vratsa, Minyor Pernik, Montana and Etar 1924 were relegated to B Group and only two teams were promoted from B Group with the object of decreasing the number of teams from 16 to 14 only for the current season. It has to be noted that only Botev Vratsa and Montana joined the 2013-14 B Group. Etar and Minyor were not given licenses to compete due to financial problems.

The relegated teams were replaced by Neftochimic Burgas, the 2012–13 B Group champions and Lyubimets, the 2012–13 B Group runner-up. On 8 May 2013 Neftochimic earned promotion after winning their match against Shumen 2010 with result of 3:1 and returned to A Group after seven years of absence. Their participation in A Group will include the Burgas derby between them and Chernomorets. Lyubimets on the other hand made their debut in the highest level of Bulgarian football.

Stadia and locations

Note: Table lists in alphabetical order.

Personnel and sponsoring
Note: Flags indicate national team as has been defined under FIFA eligibility rules. Players and Managers may hold more than one non-FIFA nationality.

First phase
The first 26 Rounds comprise the first phase of the season, also called the Regular season. In the first phase, every team plays each other team twice on a home-away basis till all the teams have played two matches against each other. The table standings at the end of the Regular season determine the group in which each team is going to play in the Play-offs.

League table

Results
Each team played against every other team for a total of 26 matches.

Round by round

Positions by round

Second phase
After the first 26 Rounds comprising the Regular season, the teams are divided into two groups of seven determined by their standings in the table at the end of the Regular season. The second phase is also referred to as the Play-offs. The teams in each group of the Play-offs again play on a home-away basis but only with the teams in their respective group. Hence, the total number of games each team has to play in this phase is 12 (twice with each of the other six teams in the group). Yet, since the number of teams in each group is odd (seven), each round of the second phase of the season consists of three games between six teams per group, and the odd team in the group does not play this round. Thus, there are 14 rounds in the Play-offs, despite there being only 12 matches a team has to play.

Championship group
The top seven teams at the end of the Regular season play in the Championship group to determine the champion for the season. Additionally, the teams in this group compete for the Bulgarian spots in UEFA's 2014-15 editions of Champions League and Europa League.

At the end of the Play-offs, the team placed first in the group can compete in the qualifying rounds of 2014–15 UEFA Champions League. The second and the third placed teams earn the right to compete in the qualifying rounds of 2014–15 UEFA Europa League. If the winner of the 2013–14 Bulgarian Cup is one of those top three teams, the fourth placed team in the group also earns a right to participate in the qualifying rounds of the Europa League.

Relegation group
The bottom seven teams at the end of the Regular season play in the Relegation group'' to determine which four teams are relegated to B PFG for next season.

At the end of the Play-offs, the bottom four teams of this group will be directly relegated.

Season statistics

Top scorers

Updated on 18 May 2014

Top assists

Hat-tricks

4 Player scored 4 goals

Scoring
 First goal of the season: Petar Atanasov for Chernomorets against Cherno More (Friday, 19 July 2013)
 Fastest goal of the season: 27 seconds 
Chris Gadi for Lokomotiv Plovdiv against CSKA (Saturday, 26 October);
Ivan Valchanov for Lyubimets against Pirin (Gotse Delchev) (Saturday, 23 November)
 Widest winning margin: 7 goals
 CSKA (Sofia) 7-0 Lyubimets (Saturday, 14 December)
 Highest scoring game: 8 goals
 Botev (Plovdiv) 7-1 Pirin (GD) (Sunday, 28 July)
 Litex 6-2 Pirin (GD) (Saturday, 9 November)
 Most goals scored in a match by a single team: 7 goals
 Botev (Plovdiv) 7-1 Pirin (GD) (Sunday, 28 July)
 CSKA (Sofia) 7-0 Lyubimets (Saturday, 14 December)

Clean sheets
 Club(s) with most clean sheets - 25 
 Ludogorets
 Clubs with  24 clean sheets 
 CSKA Sofia
 Clubs with  17 clean sheets 
 Beroe Stara Zagora

Updated to games played on 18 May 2014

Awards

Weekly awards

Player of the Round

Transfers
List of Bulgarian football transfers summer 2013
List of Bulgarian football transfers winter 2013–14

References

2013-14
Bul
1